The Bushmaster BA50 is a bolt-action, magazine-fed rifle designed to shoot the .50 BMG cartridge.  It has a 22- (carbine) or 30-inch, match grade Lothar Walther free-floating barrel with a 1-in-15-inch twist rate (standard for the .50 BMG cartridge).  The rifle weighs 30 pounds (without a magazine or ammunition) and has a muzzle brake to help tame the recoil.  Bushmaster literature says that the rifle recoils like a .243 Winchester.  The barrel has a MIL-STD-1913 rail (Picatinny style) for mounting a rifle scope.

The BA50 was the original design of Cobb Manufacturing. Bushmaster purchased the design and upgraded it and released it as the Bushmaster BA50.

Bushmaster states that the rifle is capable of shooting 1 minute of angle (MOA) with M33 ball ammunition.

In 2020 Remington, who owns Bushmaster, rebranded the rifle to be released as the "R2Mi."

Features
 Bolt action: bolt is on the left side of the receiver
 Magpul PRS adjustable buttstock with LimbSaver® recoil pad
 High-efficiency recoil-reducing brake minimizes rearward force comparable to .243 Winchester
 Disassembles like an AR-type rifle for cleaning and maintenance
 Rate of twist: 1 in 15″
 MIL-STD-1913 rail at 12 o'clock position on vented fore-end
 Steel bipod with folding legs(M60 style)
 ErgoGrip Deluxe Tactical Pistol Grip
 Lower receiver machined from T6-6061 aluminum billet
 Upper is machined from T6-6061 extrusion with MIL-ST-1913 rail
 Manganese phosphate finish on steel parts
 Hard anodized black finish on aluminum parts (mil-spec)
 Barrel free-floated within vented fore-end

Users

 Mexican Cartels

References

External links
 Official website

.50 BMG sniper rifles
Bolt-action rifles of the United States
Bushmaster firearms